Hesperantha coccinea, the river lily, or crimson flag lily (syn. Schizostylis coccinea Backh. & Harv.), is a species of flowering plant in the iris family Iridaceae, native to Southern Africa and Zimbabwe.

The flowers are red, occasionally pink or white, 30–35 mm long, with six petals; they are produced four to ten alternately on a spike in late summer to autumn.

The Latin specific epithet coccinea means “bright red”.

Cultivation
Hesperantha coccinea is cultivated as an ornamental plant in gardens for its flowers, It is often used in floristry. It was formerly known in cultivation as "Kaffir lily", and is still occasionally referenced as such. However, "Kaffir" is now regarded as an offensive ethnic slur.

Numerous cultivars are available, of which the following have gained the Royal Horticultural Society's Award of Garden Merit:- 
'Jennifer' (mid-pink)
'Major' (scarlet)
'Sunrise' (salmon pink)
 'Wilfred H. Bryant' (blush pink)

See also

 List of plants known as lily

References

External links

PlantZAfrica: Hesperantha coccinea
UBC Botany Photo of the Day: Hesperantha coccinea

Iridaceae
Flora of Zimbabwe
Flora of Southern Africa
Garden plants of Southern Africa